This is a list of members of the Victorian Legislative Council between 1928 and 1931. As half of the Legislative Council's terms expired at each triennial election, half of these members were elected at the 1925 triennial election with terms expiring in 1931, while the other half were elected at the 1928 triennial election with terms expiring in 1934.

 In October 1928, Robert Menzies, Nationalist MLC for East Yarra Province, resigned to contest Nunawading at the 1929 Assembly election. Nationalist candidate Clifden Eager won the resulting by-election in February 1930.
 On 11 May 1929, Norman Falkiner, Nationalist MLC for Melbourne South Province, died. Nationalist candidate Harold Cohen won the resulting by-election in June 1929.

Sources
 Re-member (a database of all Victorian MPs since 1851). Parliament of Victoria.

Members of the Parliament of Victoria by term
20th-century Australian politicians